On 25 September 2002, two gunmen conducted an attack on the Idara-e-Amn-o-Insaf near Rimpa Plaza in Karachi, Pakistan. The two gunmen entered the building with TT pistols and made the entire office staff hostage. Then, they blind-folded them and killed them one-by-one. Six were killed on the spot while one died in the hospital.

Background
Idara Amn-o-Insaf is a Christian charity based in Karachi, Pakistan. It was formed in 1974 with financial assistance of the World Council of Churches.

Victims
Following were the seven victims who died:
 Iqbal Allah Rakha, 40
 Benjiman Sadiq, 26
 Kamran Anjum, 25
 Jan Muneer, 30
 Aslam Martin, 45
 Mushtaq Roshan, 51
 Edwin Foster, 20

References

2002 murders in Pakistan
21st-century mass murder in Pakistan
Persecution of Christians in Pakistan
Terrorist incidents in Pakistan in 2002
September 2002 events in Pakistan
Mass shootings in Pakistan
Deaths by firearm in Sindh
2002 mass shootings in Asia